Charles B. Cady (December 1865 – June 7, 1909) was an American Major League Baseball pitcher/outfielder in the 19th century. In 1883 he played in three games for the Cleveland Blues of the National League, and in 1884 played in six games for the Chicago Browns and in two games for the Kansas City Cowboys, both of the Union Association.

In 11 total games, Cady was just 2-for-34 at the plate, a batting average of .059.  He was much more successful as a pitcher.  In five starts, all complete games, he was 3–2 with an earned run average of 3.77.

At age 17 in 1883, he was the second-youngest player to appear in a National League game, and at age 18 in 1884 was the sixth-youngest in the Union Association.

External links
Baseball Reference

Major League Baseball pitchers
Major League Baseball outfielders
19th-century baseball players
Cleveland Blues (NL) players
Chicago Browns/Pittsburgh Stogies players
Kansas City Cowboys (UA) players
1865 births
1909 deaths
Minneapolis Millers (baseball) players
Hartford Dark Blues (minor league) players
Boston Blues players
Chicago Maroons players
Burlington Babies players
Baseball players from Chicago